Malcolm Stewart (born May 15, 1948) is a Canadian film actor. Stewart graduated from the University of Vermont and later attended Columbia University Graduate School in New York. He made his Broadway debut in "Dracula" with Frank Langella, and has since appeared in Broadway shows including "Bedroom Farce" and "Torch Song Trilogy". He is also a licensed pilot.

Selected filmography

External links
 

1948 births
Living people
20th-century Canadian male actors
21st-century Canadian male actors
Anglophone Quebec people
Canadian aviators
Canadian male film actors
Canadian male television actors
Canadian male voice actors
Male actors from Montreal
University of Vermont alumni